The fourth season of the American crime drama series The Sopranos began airing on HBO on September 15, 2002, and concluded on December 8, 2002, consisting of thirteen episodes. The fourth season was released on DVD in region 1 on October 28, 2003.

The story of season four focuses on the marriage between Tony and Carmela, as Tony engages in an affair with his uncle's nurse Svetlana and Carmela finds herself infatuated with Furio. The increasing tension between Tony and Ralph Cifaretto comes to a violent head and Uncle Junior is again put on trial for his crimes. Adriana is forced into becoming an FBI informant, while Christopher plunges deeper into heroin addiction.

Cast and characters

Main cast 
James Gandolfini as Anthony Soprano (13 episodes), the underboss of the DiMeo crime family, struggling with a rogue capo, his wife, and his finances.
Lorraine Bracco as Jennifer Melfi (10 episodes), Tony's therapist.
Edie Falco as Carmela Soprano (13 episodes), Tony's wife, who becomes doubtful of their relationship and finances.
Michael Imperioli as Christopher Moltisanti (11 episodes), a soldier and Tony's cousin by marriage, who begins using heroin regularly as Tony grooms him to be his successor.
Dominic Chianese as Corrado "Junior" Soprano (9 episodes), Tony's uncle and the boss of the family, who is on trial for his crimes.
Steven Van Zandt as Silvio Dante (12 episodes), the family's loyal consigliere.
Tony Sirico as Paulie "Walnuts" Gualtieri (10 episodes), a short-tempered capo who begins to doubt his loyalty to Tony.
Robert Iler as Anthony "A. J." Soprano, Jr. (12 episodes), Tony's son.
Jamie-Lynn Sigler as Meadow Soprano (7 episodes), Tony's daughter, whose relationship with her mother strains following the death of her ex-boyfriend.
Drea de Matteo as Adriana La Cerva (9 episodes), Chris's fiancée, who becomes entangled with enemies of the family.
Aida Turturro as Janice Soprano (10 episodes), Tony's dramatic sister who begins inserting herself into Bobby's love life.
Federico Castelluccio as Furio Giunta (10 episodes), a soldier who falls in love with someone he shouldn't.
John Ventimiglia as Artie Bucco (6 episodes), Tony's non-mob friend who runs a restaurant, struggling with his recent divorce and his restaurant.
Vincent Curatola as Johnny "Sack" Sacrimoni (8 episodes), the underboss of the Lupertazzi family who befriends Paulie.
Steven R. Schirripa as Bobby Baccalieri (10 episodes), a kind-hearted capo who suffers a personal tragedy.
Joe Pantoliano as Ralph Cifaretto (10 episodes), a violent, crude capo whose issues with Tony grow more severe.
Kathrine Narducci as Charmaine Bucco (2 episodes), Artie's ex-wife.

Recurring cast

Episodes

Reception

Critical reviews
Rotten Tomatoes reports a 92% approval rating with an average score of 9.00/10 based on 12 reviews for the show's fourth season, with the following critical consensus: "The war seeps into the Sopranos household in a season of discontent, with each of these artfully rendered devils stewing in a divine comedy of their own making."

Awards and nominations
55th Primetime Emmy Awards
Nomination for Outstanding Drama Series
Award for Outstanding Lead Actor in a Drama Series (James Gandolfini) (Episode: "Whitecaps")
Award for Outstanding Lead Actress in a Drama Series (Edie Falco) (Episode: "Whitecaps")
Nomination for Outstanding Supporting Actor in a Drama Series (Michael Imperioli) (Episodes: "Whoever Did This" + "The Strong, Silent Type")
Award for Outstanding Supporting Actor in a Drama Series (Joe Pantoliano) (Episodes: "Christopher" + "Whoever Did This")
Nomination for Outstanding Directing for a Drama Series (John Patterson) (Episode: "Whitecaps")
Nomination for Outstanding Directing for a Drama Series (Timothy Van Patten) (Episode: "Whoever Did This")
Award for Outstanding Writing for a Drama Series (Robin Green, Mitchell Burgess, David Chase) (Episode: "Whitecaps")
Nomination for Outstanding Writing for a Drama Series (Robin Green, Mitchell Burgess) (Episode: "Whoever Did This")
Nomination for Outstanding Writing for a Drama Series (Terrence Winter) (Episode: "Eloise")

9th Screen Actors Guild Awards
Nomination for Outstanding Performance by an Ensemble in a Drama Series (Entire Cast)
Award for Outstanding Performance by a Male Actor in a Drama Series (James Gandolfini)
Award for Outstanding Performance by a Female Actor in a Drama Series (Edie Falco)

60th Golden Globe Awards
Nomination for Best Drama Series
Nomination for Best Actor in a Drama Series (James Gandolfini)
Award for Best Actress in a Drama Series (Edie Falco)
Nomination for Best Supporting Actor in a Series, Miniseries, or TV Movie (Michael Imperioli)

Writers Guild of America Awards
Nomination for Best Drama Episode (Mitchell Burgess, Robin Green) (Episode: "Whoever Did This")

Directors Guild of America Awards
Nomination for Outstanding Directing for a Drama Series (Tim Van Patten) (Episode: "Whoever Did This")
Award for Outstanding Directing for a Drama Series (John Patterson) (Episode: "Whitecaps")

19th TCA Awards
Nomination for Outstanding Achievement in Drama
Award for Outstanding Individual Achievement in Drama (Edie Falco)
Nomination for Outstanding Individual Achievement in Drama (James Gandolfini)

References

External links 
 
 

2002 American television seasons
The Sopranos